Franklin S. Lawrence was a member of the Wisconsin State Assembly in 1880 and 1881. He was a Republican. Lawrence was born on February 5, 1824, in Weathersfield, Vermont.

References

People from Weathersfield, Vermont
1824 births
Year of death missing
Republican Party members of the Wisconsin State Assembly